The 2001–02 Football League (known as the Nationwide Football League for sponsorship reasons) was the 103rd completed season of The Football League.

Final league tables and results 

The tables and results below are reproduced here in the exact form that they can be found at The Rec.Sport.Soccer Statistics Foundation website, with home and away statistics separated. Play-off results are from the same website.

First Division

Team changes
The following teams changed division since the 2000–01 season.

From First Division
Promoted to FA Premier League
 Fulham
 Blackburn Rovers
 Bolton Wanderers

Relegated to Second Division
 Huddersfield Town
 Queens Park Rangers
 Tranmere Rovers

To First Division
Promoted from Second Division
 Millwall
 Rotherham United
 Walsall

Relegated from FA Premier League
 Manchester City
 Coventry City
 Bradford City

Play-offs

First Division maps

Second Division

Team changes
The following teams changed division since the 2000–01 season.

From Second Division
Promoted to First Division
 Millwall
 Rotherham United
 Walsall

Relegated to Third Division
 Bristol Rovers
 Luton Town
 Swansea City
 Oxford United

To Second Division
Promoted from Third Division
 Brighton & Hove Albion
 Cardiff City
 Chesterfield
 Blackpool

Relegated from First Division
 Huddersfield Town
 Queens Park Rangers
 Tranmere Rovers

Play-offs

Second Division maps

Third Division

Team changes
The following teams changed division since the 2000–01 season.

From Third Division
Promoted to Second Division
 Brighton & Hove Albion
 Cardiff City
 Chesterfield
 Blackpool

Relegated to Football Conference
 Barnet

To Third Division
Promoted from Football Conference
 Rushden & Diamonds

Relegated from Second Division
 Bristol Rovers
 Luton Town
 Swansea City
 Oxford United

Play-offs

Third Division maps

See also
2001–02 in English football
2001 in association football
2002 in association football

References

 
2
English Football League seasons